The Great Synagogue or Choral Synagogue in Bila Tserkva, Kyiv Oblast, in Ukraine, was built in the middle of the 19th century. Today the building, which is in good condition, is used as a college.

History 
The Great Synagogue (also known as the Choral Synagogue) was built in the years 1854 to 1860. In 1905 the synagogue was renovated and a new Holy Ark was built. Inside the building there were also several small shops, which were rented out.

In the 1920s or 1930s, the synagogue was closed by the Soviet authorities. After World War II a college was placed in the building. For this purpose additional walls were built inside.

Architecture 
The building is nearly square with outer measurements of 25,39 × 25,05m. The height to the finishing cornice is  14,91m and to the rooftop 17,50m. It has three tiers, whereby the lower two tiers are separated from the upper tier by a molded cornice.  The front facade shows six pilaster; the pilasters and the cornice are painted white with the main walls are painted in green.

Old photos show that once the third storey, although square as well, had a much smaller plan. The outer walls were therefore not continuous, but had an offset between the second and third storey.  It is not known when these changes took place.

Despite the alterations the original plan of the synagogue has been preserved. In what was initially the prayer hall, there are four round supporting pillars that continue through each tier. The former prayer hall is surrounded by synagogue rooms which were used as the women's prayer rooms.

Neither the Torah ark nor the Bema are left.

Other synagogues in Bila Tserkva  
At least  three more buildings that once were synagogues are preserved in the town. Their condition is not as good as the condition of the Great Synagogue.

See also 
 List of synagogues in Ukraine
 Bila Tserkva massacre

References

Synagogues in Ukraine
Former synagogues in Ukraine
Synagogues completed in 1860
Orthodox synagogues in Ukraine